The Starks station was a railway station in Starks, British Columbia. It was a flag stop on Via Rail's Dayliner service, which ended in 2011. The station is on the Southern Railway of Vancouver Island mainline.

Footnotes

External links 
Via Rail Station Description

Via Rail stations in British Columbia
Disused railway stations in Canada